Christine Lund, also known as Christine Lundstedt (born November 25, 1943, in Sweden) is a former popular Los Angeles news anchor for KABC-TV from the early 1970s to the late 1990s and consistently garnered high ratings.

Biography
Born in Sweden and raised in Chicago, Lund began her broadcasting career where she briefly worked at WLXT-TV in Aurora as the station's news director.  In 1970, she joined ABC owned-and-operated station KGO-TV in San Francisco as a reporter.  Later, Lund moved south to Los Angeles sister station KABC in 1972 as a reporter and anchor. She anchored the newscasts at 6:00 pm and 11:00 pm. Throughout much of her first tenure, she co-anchored with the late Jerry Dunphy.  Lund left KABC for 4 years in 1986 to raise her family.  She returned to the station in 1990. During her second tenure, she anchored the 11:30 am and 4:00 pm newscasts until she officially left the station in 1998.

Personal
Lund has two grown daughters, and currently lives on the Northwest coast of the US.

Pop Reference
Lund was rumored to be the "bubbleheaded bleach blond" referred to in Don Henley's "Dirty Laundry" song.

References

External links

Television anchors from Los Angeles
American television reporters and correspondents
1944 births
Living people
Swedish emigrants to the United States